Ravi Rajendra Maurya (born 18 November 1997) is an Indian cricketer. He made his List A debut for Nagaland in the 2018–19 Vijay Hazare Trophy on 19 September 2018.

References

External links
 

1997 births
Living people
Indian cricketers
Nagaland cricketers
Place of birth missing (living people)